"Déjà Vu" is a song by Italian disc jockey producer Giorgio Moroder, featuring vocals from Australian singer Sia. The song is the third single on Moroder's 2015 album, Déjà Vu. It was released on 17 April 2015, as a digital download via iTunes.

Composition 
"Déjà Vu" is a disco-rooted song with a "funky" '70s pop vibe, supported by disco-infused guitars and a four on the floor beat.

Music video
Directed by Alexandra Dahlström, the music video follows a young man (played by Drew Lipson) who visits a hotel and repeatedly encounters multiple Sia lookalikes, that are either loving and kind or manipulative and nasty to the man, who, unfortunately, can not tell the difference between the look-alikes. A teaser for the video was released on 30 April, with the official video premiering on 5 May 2015.

Track listing
Digital download – single
"Déjà Vu" – 3:20

Digital download – remixes
"Déjà Vu"  – 5:23
"Déjà Vu"  – 4:50
"Déjà Vu"  – 5:37
"Déjà Vu"  – 3:42

Chart performance 
In the UK the song charted on the UK Singles chart however it failed to enter the top 100 but instead entered the top 200 peaking at 194. The song also charted in France peaking at 182. In Scotland the song charted on the Scotland OCC peaking at 93. The song had more success in Japan peaking at 35 on the Japan Hot 100 and charted for 3 weeks. The song peaked at number 1 on the US Dance Club Songs chart becoming his 3rd chart topper on that chart, and it also charted on the US Hot Dance/Electronic Songs chart peaking at number 25.

Charts

Weekly charts

Year-end charts

Release history

Tracks in other languages

See also
 List of number-one dance singles of 2015 (U.S.)

References

External links

2015 singles
2014 songs
Giorgio Moroder songs
RCA Records singles
Sia (musician) songs
Song recordings produced by Giorgio Moroder
Songs written by Giorgio Moroder
Songs written by Sia (musician)